Lindsay Davenport was the defending champion, but withdrew due to a lower-back strain.

Kim Clijsters won the title, defeating Daniela Hantuchová 6–4, 6–1 in the final.

Seeds
The top eight seeds receive a bye into the second round.

Draw

Finals

Top half

Section 1

Section 2

Bottom half

Section 3

Section 4

References

External links
http://www.itftennis.com/procircuit/tournaments/women's-tournament/info.aspx?tournamentid=1100012537&event=
http://www.wtatennis.com/SEWTATour-Archive/Archive/Draws/2005/805.pdf

Singles
2005 WTA Tour
2005 in American tennis